Marsciano is a comune (municipality) in the Province of Perugia in the Italian region Umbria, located about 25 km south of Perugia.   

Marsciano borders the following municipalities: Collazzone, Deruta, Fratta Todina, Perugia, Piegaro, San Venanzo, Todi.

The main church in the center of town is the neo-gothic style San Giovanni Battista. The facade of the 19th century Teatro Concordia serves as a portal to a modern cinema theater.

Rivers
The municipality is watered by the little Nestore River, a tributary of the Tiber.   Marsciano's eastern border with neighboring Collazzone is marked by the River Tiber itself.

Twin towns - sister cities
Marsciano is twinned with:
 Tremblay-en-France, France, since 1982
 Orosei, Italy, since 1985
 Loropéni, Burkina Faso, since 1987
 Jablonec nad Nisou, Czech Republic, since 1998

People
 Giancarlo Antognoni, former footballer, world champion with Italy national football team in 1982.
 Monia Baccaille, road cyclist.
 Marco Bocci, actor.
 Trebonianus Gallus, Roman emperor from 251 to 253.
 Simone Mortaro, Italian footballer.
 Walter Sabatini, former footballer and coach.
 Luigi Salvatorelli, historian and journalist.
 Francesco Satolli, cardinal of the catholic church.

References

External links

 www.comune.marsciano.pg.it/

Cities and towns in Umbria